Remote monitoring and control (M&C) systems are designed to control large or complex facilities such as factories, power plants, network operations centers, airports, and spacecraft, with some degree of automation.

M&C systems may receive data from sensors, telemetry streams, user inputs, and pre-programmed procedures. The software may send telecommands to actuators, computer systems, or other devices.

M&C systems may perform closed-loop control.

Once limited to SCADA in industrial settings, remote monitoring and control is now applied in numerous fields, including:
 Smart grids
 Positive train control
 Structural health monitoring
 Pipeline sensors
 Patient monitoring
 Desktop/server monitoring

While this field overlaps with machine to machine communications, the two are not completely identical.

See also 
Control engineering
Control room
Control theory
Instrument control
Remote sensing
Remote terminal unit
 M&C!

Automation software
Control engineering